There are at least 993 named trails in Montana according to the U.S. Geological Survey, Board of Geographic Names.  A trail is defined as: "Route for passage from one point to another; does not include roads or highways (jeep trail, path, ski trail)."

 List of trails of Beaverhead County, Montana
 Big Horn County, Montana
 Soldier Trail, el.  
 Three Springs Trail, el.  
 Blaine County, Montana
 Cow Island Trail, el.  
 Broadwater County, Montana
 Divide Trail, el.  
 Flathead Indian Trail, el.  
 List of trails of Carbon County, Montana
 Chouteau County, Montana
 Hole in the Wall Trail, el.  
 Clearwater County, Idaho
 Lolo Trail, el.  
 State Line Trail (Montana), el.  
 Dawson County, Montana
 Cap Rock Nature Trail, el.  
 Deer Lodge County, Montana
 Long Canyon Trail, el.  
 Fergus County, Montana
 Crystal Lake National Recreation Trail, el.  
 Old Musselshell Trail, el.  
 Skyline Trail, el.  
 Wagon Wheel Trail, el.  
 Wilder Trail, el.  
 List of trails of Flathead County, Montana
 List of trails of Gallatin County, Montana
 List of trails of Glacier County, Montana
 List of trails of Granite County, Montana
 Hill County, Montana
 Mogul Alley Ski Trail, el.  
 North Bowl Ski Trail, el.  
 Screaming Eagle Ski Trail, el.  
 Teacup Ski Trail, el.  
 The Face Ski Trail, el.  
 Towering Heights Ski Trail, el.  
 Jefferson County, Montana
 Fetters Trail, el.  
 Upper Whitetail Park Trail, el.  
 Lake County, Montana
 Crow Creek Trail, el.  
 Crow Creek Trail, el.  
 Peterson Creek Trail, el.  
 Wire Trail, el.  
 Lemhi County, Idaho
 Divide Trail, el.  
 List of trails of Lewis and Clark County, Montana
 List of trails of Lincoln County, Montana
 List of trails of Madison County, Montana
 List of trails of Meagher County, Montana
 Mineral County, Montana
 Cedar Creek Stock Driveway, el.  
 Oriole Creek Trail, el.  
 Storm Peak Trail, el.  
 Trout Creek Stock Driveway, el.  
 List of trails of Missoula County, Montana
 List of trails of Park County, Montana
 Petroleum County, Montana
 Horse Camp Trail, el.  
 Pondera County, Montana
 North Badger-Elbow Creek Trail, el.  
 List of trails of Powell County, Montana
 Prairie County, Montana
 Calypso Trail, el.  
 List of trails of Ravalli County, Montana
 Richland County, Montana
 Lewis and Clark National Historic Trail, el.  
 List of trails of Sanders County, Montana
 Sweet Grass County, Montana
 Black Butte Trail, el.  
 Bozeman Trail, el.  
 Lodgepole Trail, el.  
 Teton County, Montana
 Jones Creek National Recreation Trail, el.  
 Mortimer Gulch National Recreation Trail, el.  
 South Fork Teton-Blacktail National Recreation Trail, el.  
 West Fork Jones Creek National Recreation Trail, el.  
 Toole County, Montana
 Bootlegger Trail, el.  
 Yellowstone County, Montana
 Bill Bartley Trail, el.  
 John Dunn Trail, el.

Further reading

Notes